The 2008 EHF European Women's Handball Championship was held in the Republic of Macedonia from 2–14 December, it was won by Norway after beating Spain 34–21 in the final match.

Venues
Two Macedonian cities have been selected as hosts for the 2008 Championship:

Qualification
In total, 16 national teams qualified for the final tournament:

Host Country
  (3) :1998,2000,2006

Qualified from the 2006 European Championship
  (7) :1994,1996,1998,2000,2002,2004,2006 (Defending Champions)
  (7) :1994,1996,1998,2000,2002,2004,2006
  (4) :2000,2002,2004,2006
  (7) :1994,1996,1998,2000,2002,2004,2006
  (7) :1994,1996,1998,2000,2002,2004,2006

Qualified from play-offs

|}

Squads

Each nation had to submit an initial squad of 28 players, 12 of them became reserves when the final squad of 16 players was announced on 1 December 2008.

Seeding
The draw for the preliminary round groups took place on 20 July 2008, in Ohrid.

Format
Preliminary Round: 16 teams are divided into four groups. They play each other in a single round robin system, so each team plays three matches. A win is worth two points, while a draw is worth one point. The top three teams from each group advance to the Main Round.
Main Round: 12 teams are divided in two groups. They play against the teams they didn't play in the preliminary round, so each team plays 3 matches. All points from the preliminary round, except the points gained against the 4th place team in the preliminary group, are carried forward into the Main Round. Same round robin rules apply as in the preliminary round. Top 2 teams from each group advance to the semifinals, while the third placed team from each group advances to the 5th-6th Place Play-off.
Final Round: 6 teams play in the final weekend of the championships. 3rd place teams from the Main Round play in the 5th-6th Place Play-off. Other teams play in the semifinals. Losers of the semifinals advance to the 3rd-4th Place Play-off, and winners advance to the Final.

Preliminary round
All times are local (UTC+1).

Group A

Group B

Group C

Group D

Main round

Group I

Group II

Final round

Bracket

Fifth place game

Semifinals

Third place game

Final

Ranking and Statistics

Final ranking

Source: EuroHandball.com

All-Star Team
Goalkeeper: 
Left wing: 
Left back: 
Pivot: 
Centre back: 
Right back: 
Right wing: 
Best defence player: 
Most valuable player: 
Chosen by team officials and EHF experts: EHF-Euro.com

Top goalscorers

Source: EHF

Top goalkeepers
(minimum 20% of total shots received by team)

Source: EHF-Euro.com

Notes

External links
European Handball Federation
8th Women's Handball European Championship 2008 in the Republic of Macedonia
EHF Women's EURO 2008

 
European Women's Handball Championship
E
E
International handball competitions hosted by North Macedonia
Women's handball in North Macedonia
December 2008 sports events in Europe
2000s in Skopje
Sports competitions in Skopje
Sport in Ohrid